MS Stag Hound was a Type C2-SU-R refrigerated diesel motor powered cargo ship built by Sun Shipbuilding for United States Lines. All hands were rescued by an Argentine ship.

Career 
Stag Hound was laid down at Sun Shipbuilding of Chester, Pennsylvania. Constructed under a United States Maritime Commission contract (MC hull number 116) on behalf of United States Lines of New York, she was launched on 18 October 1941. After Stag Hounds September 1942 completion, she  was registered at New York and armed with one  and one  deck gun and six machine guns, and took on fourteen Naval Armed Guardsmen to man the guns.

On 28 February 1943, Stag Hound departed New York for Rio de Janeiro with a  cargo that included dynamite, trucks, gas, and steel. The torpedoes destroyed the steering gear and the ship's antenna, and the ship's master, Harold T. McCaw, ordered the fatally damaged vessel abandoned. The ship's 10 officers (including McCaw), 49 men, and 25 Naval Armed Guardsmen boarded two lifeboats and one life raft ten minutes after the attack. Barbarigo launched a coup de grâce that hit the still-floating ship, causing her to sink stern-first at 19:50, 35 minutes after the initial attack. After 25 hours in the water, all hands were rescued by the Argentine steamer  and were landed at Rio de Janeiro on 8 March.

Notes

References 
 

 

Type C2-SU ships
1941 ships
World War II merchant ships of the United States
Ships built by the Sun Shipbuilding & Drydock Company
Ships sunk by Italian submarines
World War II shipwrecks in the Atlantic Ocean
Maritime incidents in March 1943